Iglehart is an unincorporated community in Anne Arundel County, Maryland, United States. Iglehart was listed on the National Register of Historic Places in 1973.

References

Unincorporated communities in Anne Arundel County, Maryland
Unincorporated communities in Maryland